Edward P. "Ed" McAleney (born September 21, 1953 in South Portland, Maine) is a former American football defensive lineman who played one season in the National Football League for the Tampa Bay Buccaneers. 

He was drafted in the 1976 NFL Draft by the Pittsburgh Steelers. He later played in the Canadian Football League for the Calgary Stampeders where he was named Western All-Star in 1980, and he finished his pro career with the Orlando Renegades of the USFL in 1985.

McAleney played college football at University of Massachusetts Amherst.

External links
 http://www.bucpower.com/ed-mcaleney.html
 http://umassathletics.cstv.com/sports/m-footbl/spec-rel/082603aab.html

1953 births
Living people
Sportspeople from South Portland, Maine
Players of American football from Maine
American football defensive linemen
UMass Minutemen football players
American players of Canadian football
Canadian football defensive linemen
Calgary Stampeders players
Tampa Bay Buccaneers players
Washington Federals/Orlando Renegades players
Pittsburgh Maulers players